Acciona, S.A. is a Spanish multinational conglomerate dedicated to the development and management of infrastructure (construction, water, industrial and services) and renewable energy. The company, via subsidiary Acciona Energy, produces 21 terawatt-hours of renewable electricity a year.

The company was founded in 1997 through the merger of Entrecanales y Tavora and Cubiertas y MZOV. The company's headquarters is in Alcobendas, Community of Madrid, Spain.  The company's U.S. operations are headquartered in Chicago, Illinois.

The Company employs 30,000 professionals, and it is to be found in 30 countries on five continents. The company is IBEX 35-listed and an industry benchmark.

History 
The company can trace its origins back to MZOV, a firm founded in 1862. In 1978 MZOV merged with Cubiertas y Tejados, a business founded in 1916, to form Cubiertas y MZOV. In 1997 the company merged with Entrecanales y Tavora, a firm founded in 1931, to form NECSO Entrecanales Cubiertas S.A.. It was subsequently renamed Acciona.

Operations 
The group is organised as follows:
 Infrastructure
 Energy - through Acciona Energy
 Water
 Other Businesses

Sustainability indexes 
Acciona obtained the distinctive RobecoSAM Silver Class 2015 in the Electric Utilities sector under the Sustainability Yearbook 2015 for its best practices in sustainability.
It has also been included in the CDP Climate Leadership Index 2014 Performance index, which lists the 187 world companies that have received the highest rating for its performance in the fight against climate change.

Major projects 

Major projects involving the company include the Torre Europa completed in 1985, the Ting Kau Bridge in Hong Kong completed in 1998, the Gare do Oriente in Lisbon completed in 1998, El Museu de les Ciències Príncipe Felipe completed in 2000, the German Chancellery completed in 2001, the King Abdullah University Hospital completed in 2002, the Alqueva Dam completed in 2002, and the El Palau de les Arts Reina Sofía completed in 2005.

As part of a Public Private Partnership with the New South Wales State Government, Acciona was responsible for delivering the infrastructure for the Sydney CBD and South East Light Rail project which was completed in April 2020. Acciona is suing the government seeking $1.1 billion in additional funding, claiming the government minimized the amount of subterranean utility works that would be required.

Another Public Private Partnership has been signed with the São Paulo State Government under which Acciona will undertake the construction works for and operate Line 6-Orange of São Paulo Metro which is due to be completed in 2024.

In January 2018 Acciona signed a EUR 100 million loan with the European Investment Bank. The European Fund for Strategic Investments is a European Union initiative designed to provide financial support for innovative companies. EFSI works with companies which are considered risky because their untested technologies or have products with a limited track record. Acciona will use the loan to expand its research in renewable energy, infrastructure, water and digitalisation to increase efficiency in the construction and operation of its electricity-generation plants. It will also develop sustainable biological water treatment and purification processes and develop ways to recycle waste and in building environmentally friendly infrastructure.

The company is testing prefabricated components which are lighter and less expensive to transport whilst maintaining high strength. Acciona built the first lighthouse in the world constructed of prefabricated products, in Valencia, Spain.

In August 2022, the company won a contract worth about 485 million euros for the Victoria Park-Canning Level Crossing Removal Project to upgrade the Armadale line in Perth, Australia. This involved eliminating six level crossings along the train line and rebuilding five stations.

References

External links 
 

Conglomerate companies of Spain
Construction and civil engineering companies of Spain
Energy companies of Spain
Renewable energy companies of Spain
Transport companies of Spain
Multinational companies headquartered in Spain
Companies based in the Community of Madrid
Companies listed on the Madrid Stock Exchange
IBEX 35
Spanish companies established in 1997
Construction and civil engineering companies established in 1997